Elizabeth Bartlett (1924–2008) was a British poet.

Life
She grew up in Deal, Kent.  She won a grammar school scholarship. At nineteen, she married Denis Perkins. She was stepmother to his two sons, Benedick and Adrian, and they had a son, Alex. She lived in Burgess Hill, West Sussex, for 60 years.

She worked for 16 years in the health service.

Awards
 1996 Cholmondeley Award

References

External links
 "Elizabeth Bartlett Reading", Poetry Archive

1924 births
2008 deaths
British women poets
People from Deal, Kent
People from Burgess Hill
20th-century British poets
20th-century British women writers